Ashes Grammar is the second studio album by American indie rock band A Sunny Day in Glasgow. It was released on September 15, 2009 by Mis Ojos Discos.

Background and recording
Following a successful European tour, A Sunny Day in Glasgow's Ben Daniels began preparations for the recording of the band's next album. He rented a large dance studio space within the Downtown Performing Arts Center in Lambertville, which became the primary location for recording. He and bandmate Josh Meakim then began experimenting with sounds and setting up microphones in the space. Prior to the start of formal work on the album, however, three members of A Sunny Day in Glasgow departed the band under varying circumstances: Brice Hickey, who had "very seriously" broken his legs in an accident while loading equipment into his car on the day that recording was set to begin; Lauren Daniels, who left in order to care for Hickey, her then-boyfriend; and Robin Daniels, who wished to pursue her graduate studies. The band was subsequently reduced to Ben Daniels and Josh Meakim. Annie Fredrickson was later invited to join A Sunny Day in Glasgow on the recommendation of a fan of the band who was familiar to Ben Daniels "from shows", after Daniels asked the fan whether he knew any vocalists. The trio of Daniels, Meakim and Fredrickson helmed the album's recording.

Ashes Grammar was recorded from September to December 2008. The expansiveness of the dance studio space allowed Ben Daniels the freedom to experiment with different acoustics. He has cited Alvin Lucier's I Am Sitting in a Room as an influence on the recording process. As Lauren and Robin Daniels, the lead singers on earlier A Sunny Day in Glasgow recordings, had left the band, vocal duties on Ashes Grammar were shared by Fredrickson and Meakim. Fredrickson's friend Beverly Science performed additional vocals on the album. Mich White, who was previously a touring bassist for A Sunny Day in Glasgow, also "contributed ideas" from his home in Austin.

Critical reception

In 2016, Pitchfork ranked Ashes Grammar at number 35 on its list of the best shoegaze albums of all time.

Track listing

Notes
 The track order for the LP edition repositions "Blood White" between "Passionate Introverts (Dinosaurs)" and "West Philly Vocoder".

Personnel
Credits are adapted from the album's liner notes.

A Sunny Day in Glasgow
 Ben Daniels
 Robin Daniels
 Annie Fredrickson
 Brice Hickey
 Josh Meakim
 Beverly Science
 Mich White

Additional musicians
 Jody Hamilton – horns on "Failure" and "Close Chorus"
 Ryan Mitchell – theremin on "Curse Words"
 Chuck Nicholson – vibraphone on "Nitetime Rainbows"

Production
 Matt Coogan – mastering
 Ben Daniels – mixing
 Tom Kee – mastering
 Josh Meakim – mixing, recording

Design
 Naomi Donabedian – layout
 Jaakko Mattila – artwork

References

External links
 

2009 albums
A Sunny Day in Glasgow albums